Bradie is a given name and surname. People with the name include:

 Bradie Ewing (born 1989), American former National Football League player
 Bradie James (born 1981), American National Football League player
 Bradie Tennell (born 1998), American figure skater
 Stuart Bradie (born 1966), Scottish businessman

See also
 Brady (disambiguation)

English-language unisex given names